84 Brook Green is a building at 84 Brook Green, Hammersmith, London, W6 7BD.

The house dates from the mid-19th century. It was both the workplace of the Silver Studio and the Silver family.

References

Houses in the London Borough of Hammersmith and Fulham
Houses completed in the 19th century